Marcel van der Sloot (born 3 June 1980) is a Dutch football coach and former player who is an assistant coach at Eerste Divisie club TOP Oss.

Playing career
Van der Sloot was born in Gouda and played youth football for SV Donk, Jodan Boys, ONA and Utrecht. He started his senior career with RBC Roosendaal, making his professional debut on 23 February 2002, replacing Winston Bakboord in the 60th minute of a 5–1 away win over Helmond Sport in the Eerste Divisie.

In 2003, Van der Sloot joined TOP Oss. He impressed with TOP during the next four seasons, scoring 35 goals in 122 appearances and earning a transfer to Eredivisie club De Graafschap on 3 April 2007. He signed a three-year contract. Due to several injuries, he never played a game for the club. He was sent on loan to Dordrecht in January 2008, and was later signed on a permanent deal by the club. He became a starter for the club but was also plagued by injuries, suffering an achilles tear in September 2009 which ruled him out for several months. In 2010, Van der Sloot shortly returned to RBC Roosendaal.

Between 2011 and 2014, where Van der Sloot announced his retirement from football, he played for TOP Oss again, becoming the all-time club top goalscorer with 58 goals in 215 appearances.

Coaching career
After retiring as a player, Van der Sloot continued as a scout for TOP Oss between 2014 and 2017. He was appointed assistant coach in June 2017 and combined this function with the role as head coach of lower league club RKSV Cluzona from Wouw. After TOP manager Kristof Aelbrecht was fired in December 2022, Van der Sloot replaced him as caretaker coach.

On 23 December 2022, it was announced that Van der Sloot had been appointed head coach of Derde Divisie club VV Dongen from the 2023–24 season.

References

External links
 Marcel van der Sloot profile at the TOP Oss website
 

1980 births
Living people
Dutch footballers
CVV de Jodan Boys players
FC Utrecht players
RBC Roosendaal players
De Graafschap players
FC Dordrecht players
TOP Oss players
Eredivisie players
Eerste Divisie players
Footballers from Gouda, South Holland
Association football midfielders
Association football coaches
TOP Oss managers
Eerste Divisie managers